Al Wusta (from Arabic الوسطى, 'central') may refer to:

 Central Governorate, Bahrain
 Central Region, Bahrain 
 Al Wusta Governorate (Oman) 
 Wusta, a former district in Libya prior to 1995

See also
 Al-Janubiyah (disambiguation) (southern)
 Al Gharbiyah (disambiguation) (western)
 Ash Shamaliyah (disambiguation) (northern)
 Ash Sharqiyah (disambiguation) (eastern)